Ectatosticta is a genus of East Asian lampshade spiders that was first described by Eugène Louis Simon in 1892.

Species 
 it contains twenty-two species, found in China:

Ectatosticta baima Lin & S. Q. Li, 2021 – China
Ectatosticta baixiang Lin & S. Q. Li, 2021 – China
Ectatosticta bajie Lin & Li, 2021 – China
Ectatosticta dapeng Lin & Li, 2021 – China
Ectatosticta davidi (Simon, 1889) – China
Ectatosticta deltshevi Platnick & Jäger, 2009 – China
Ectatosticta furax Wang, Zhao, Irfan & Zhang, 2021 – China
Ectatosticta helii Lin & S. Q. Li, 2021 – China
Ectatosticta menyuanensis Wang, Zhao, Irfan & Zhang, 2021 – China
Ectatosticta pingwuensis Wang, Zhao, Irfan & Zhang, 2021 – China
Ectatosticta puxian Lin & S. Q. Li, 2021 – China
Ectatosticta qingshi Lin & S. Q. Li, 2021 – China
Ectatosticta rulai Lin & Li, 2021 – China
Ectatosticta shaseng Lin & S. Q. Li, 2021 – China
Ectatosticta shennongjiaensis Wang, Zhao, Irfan & Zhang, 2021 – China
Ectatosticta songpanensis Wang, Zhao, Irfan & Zhang, 2021 – China
Ectatosticta wenshu Lin & S. Q. Li, 2021 – China
Ectatosticta wukong Lin & Li, 2020 – China
Ectatosticta xuanzang Lin & Li, 2020 – China
Ectatosticta yukuni Lin & Li, 2021 – China
Ectatosticta zhouzhiensis Wang, Zhao, Irfan & Zhang, 2021 – China

References 

Araneomorphae genera
Hypochilidae
Spiders of China